Richard Bryant (8 May 1904 – 17 August 1989) was an Australian cricketer. He played 29 first-class matches for Western Australia between 1924 and 1936. He later managed the Western Australia team and brought it to winning the 1947–48 Sheffield Shield season.

References

External links

 

1904 births
1989 deaths
Western Australia cricketers
Cricketers from Perth, Western Australia